Antonio Garrigues Díaz-Cañabate, 1st Marquess of Garrigues (9 January 1904 – 24 February 2004) was a Spanish politician who served as Minister of Justice of Spain between 1975 and 1976, during the Francoist dictatorship.

References

1904 births
2004 deaths
Justice ministers of Spain
Government ministers during the Francoist dictatorship